This is a list of winners of the annual Archibald Prize for portraiture, first awarded in 1921.

List of winners

Gallery

Winners of the Packing Room Prize

Winners of the People's Choice Award

See also
Lists of Archibald Prize finalists

References

External links 
 
 Art Gallery of New South Wales Archibald Prize

Portrait art
Lists of artists
Lists of works of art